Jeanne Warren (born 4 December 1952) is a Canadian former swimmer. She competed in four events at the 1968 Summer Olympics.

References

External links
 

1952 births
Living people
Canadian female backstroke swimmers
Canadian female butterfly swimmers
Olympic swimmers of Canada
Swimmers at the 1968 Summer Olympics
Swimmers from Vancouver